Meaus is a village in the municipality of Baltar, Ourense, Galiza. The census for 2007 showed 38 inhabitants (19 men and 19 women). Until 1868 it formed with Santiago and Rubiás a de facto independent state called Couto Misto.

See also
Couto Misto

Populated places in the Province of Ourense